Brenda Atherton (born 1934) is a female former England international lawn and indoor bowler.

Bowls career
Atherton won a bronze medal in the fours at the 1985 World Outdoor Bowls Championship in Melbourne. She won two bronze medals at the Commonwealth Games; she was selected for England in the fours, at the 1986 Commonwealth Games in Edinburgh, Scotland and represented England in the pairs event, at the 1994 Commonwealth Games in Victoria, British Columbia, Canada.

She also won three National Titles ranging from 1972 until 2010. They were the Two wood singles in 1972 & 2001 and the fours in 2010.

References

English female bowls players
1934 births
Commonwealth Games medallists in lawn bowls
Commonwealth Games bronze medallists for England
Living people
Bowls players at the 1986 Commonwealth Games
Bowls players at the 1994 Commonwealth Games
Medallists at the 1986 Commonwealth Games
Medallists at the 1994 Commonwealth Games